Yuri Shulman (born April 29, 1975 in Minsk, Byelorussian SSR, USSR) is a Belarusian American chess player who holds the FIDE title of Grandmaster (GM). He also goes by the alternate spelling of "Yury Shulman." He's married to the Woman International Master (WIM) Viktorija Ni.

Chess career
Shulman started formal chess lessons with coach Tamara Golovey when he was six years old.  He went on to study under International Master Albert Kapengut at age 12, and subsequently under the guidance of GM Boris Gelfand.  He achieved his grandmaster title in 1995.  Shulman moved to the United States in 1999 to attend University of Texas at Dallas, a three-time national championship college team.

Shulman completed undergraduate studies from the State Academy of Sports, Belarus, and has a bachelor's degree in Computer Science and an M.B.A. specializing in Finance from the University of Texas at Dallas.

Shulman has remained among the top U.S. chess players since moving to the country.  He tied for first in the 2001 World Open, was runner up in the 2006 U.S. Chess Championship, and winner of the 2006 U.S. Open Chess Championship. Shulman tied for third place in the 2007 US Chess Championship and qualified for the 2007 FIDE world championship.  On May 21, 2008, Shulman won the 2008 US Chess Championship.  On May 25, 2010, he tied for first in the U.S. Chess Championship in St. Louis, losing in a rapid tie-break with GM Gata Kamsky, who became the US champion. He formerly played in the now defunct U.S. Chess League, for the strong St. Louis Archbishops, whose roster included Hikaru Nakamura.

Chess career highlights
 1994 - National Belarus champion, Top Sportsman Award, Republic of Belarus and member of the Belarusian Chess Olympic team from 1994–1998
 1998 - National Belarus champion co-champion
 1995 - European Junior Champion
 1995 - Achieved International Grandmaster norm,
 2000 - Co-Winner of US National Open, Texas State Champion, and winner of the Koltanowski Memorial
 2001 - Ranked in top 100 chess players in the world, and Co-Winner of World Open
 2002 - Co-Winner of American Open
 2004 - Tied for 3rd place in the US Chess Championship
 2005 - Illinois State Champion, co-winner of Millennium chess festival, and qualified to 1/16 in the World Cup (Khanty-Mansiysk, Siberia)
 2006 - Winner of 107th US Open Chess Championship (Chicago, Illinois, USA), U.S. Chess Championship runner-up (San Diego, California, USA), and U.S. Women Olympic team coach (4th place) (Torino, Italy)
 2006 - Co-Winner of the University of Texas at Dallas GM Invitational Tournament
 2007 - Tied for 3rd place in the US Chess Championship and qualified for the 2007 FIDE world championship (Stillwater, Oklahoma, USA)
 2007 - Tied for 1st place in the 2007 Chicago Open (Chicago, Illinois, USA). Vadim Milov won the blitz playoff game and the official title.
 2008 - Won US Chess Championship
 2010 - 1st Place tie in U.S. Chess Championship, taking 2nd in a tiebreaker game against Gata Kamsky.
 2011 - 1st Place tie in U.S. Chess Championship, taking 2nd in a tiebreaker game against Gata Kamsky.

Yury Shulman International Chess School

Shulman is the co-founder of the Yury Shulman International Chess School.  Shulman and his co-founder Rishi Sethi use chess as a medium for philanthropic causes.  In 2006 and 2007, this included community service visits to, and book drives for, Chicago public schools, and contributions of a portion of the proceeds from camps and tournaments to non-profit entities the world over.
He now teaches chess in Barrington IL at all of the schools and at his house.

'Chess Without Borders' volunteer organization
In May 2007, Shulman formally cofounded non-profit organization Chess Without Borders with Rishi Sethi  through which to continue his volunteer efforts. He now lives in Barrington, Illinois teaching chess to the kids who go to school in district 220 and at his house.

See also
 List of Jewish chess players

References

External links

 
 
 
 
 
 Chess Life Bio of Yury Shulman
 Chess Life Magazine Interview with GM Yury Shulman
 The Yury Shulman International Chess School
 Selection of GM Yury Shulman's Games from his web site

1975 births
Living people
20th-century Belarusian Jews
21st-century Belarusian Jews
Chess players from Minsk
American people of Belarusian-Jewish descent
Chess grandmasters
Chess Olympiad competitors
American chess players
Jewish chess players
University of Texas at Dallas alumni
Belarusian emigrants to the United States